Isoperla marlynia, the midwestern stripetail, is a species of green-winged stoneflies in the family Perlodidae. It is found in North America, native to the United States and Canada.

References

Further reading

 NCBI Taxonomy Browser, Isoperla marlynia
 

Perlodidae